Lansing Airport can refer to:
Capital Region International Airport in Lansing, Michigan (FAA/IATA: LAN)
Lansing Municipal Airport in Lansing, Illinois (FAA: IGQ)